Changureh (also Romanized as Changūreh and Changūrah; also known as Jānkūra and Changooreh Kharaghan Gharbi) is a village in Hesar-e Valiyeasr Rural District, Central District, Avaj County, Qazvin Province, Iran. At the 2006 census, its population was 54, in 18 families.

Changureh suffered severely in the 2002 Bou'in-Zahra earthquake, the epicenter of which was located near the village.

References 

Populated places in Avaj County